Attica is an unincorporated community and census-designated place in Attica Township, Lapeer County, Michigan, United States. Its population was 994 as of the 2010 census. Attica has a post office with ZIP code 48412.

Geography
Attica is in southeastern Lapeer County, north of the center of Attica Township. I-69 leads east  to Port Huron and west  to Flint.

Demographics

History
In 1851, William Williams from New York state built a sawmill here, and most of the settlement developed on his land. I. N. Jenness, a lumberman and also from New York, is considered as co-founder of the community. A post office named "Mill Station" was established on October 9, 1867, with Oscar A. Williams as the first postmaster. The office was renamed "Elk Lake" on September 12, 1870, and became "Attica", after the township, on February 1, 1871. The Attica Hotel, built in Attica, Michigan in the early 1870s, was originally called the Williams House and later the Schirmer House.The Williams family had 14 children, and there are five bedrooms on the second floor wing. The second floor also held a ballroom with a door leading to the second floor porch. At one time, there were a total of nine doors, and four porches, and the hotel held a post office. It was later moved to Crossroads Village in November of 1981 and the exterior was restored in 1986.

References

Unincorporated communities in Lapeer County, Michigan
Unincorporated communities in Michigan
Census-designated places in Lapeer County, Michigan
Census-designated places in Michigan